Patchoulol synthase (EC 4.2.3.70) is an enzyme with systematic name (2E,6E)-farnesyl-diphosphate diphosphate-lyase (patchoulol-forming). This enzyme catalyses the following chemical reaction

 (2E,6E)-farnesyl diphosphate + H2O  patchoulol + diphosphate

References

External links 
 

EC 4.2.3